Diemeniini is a tribe of shield bugs in the subfamily of Pentatominae.

Genera 
Alphenor – Aplerotus – Boocoris – Caridophthalmus – Commius – Diemenia – Eurynannus – Gilippus – Grossimenia – Kalkadoona – Myappena – Niarius – Oncocoris – Pseudoncocoris

References

External links 
 

 

 
Pentatominae
Hemiptera tribes